Rowland Fothergill (1794- 19 September 1871) was an ironmaster in South Wales, whose main industrial interests lay in the Aberdare district. He was high sheriff of Glamorgan in 1850.

He was the son of Richard Fothergill.

Prior to acquiring property in the Aberdare Valley, Fothergill already owned successful works at Tredegar and at Pont-hir near Chepstow. He took over the Abernant Ironworks in 1819 and four years later he took over the management of the Aberdare Iron Company's works at Llwydcoed. He eventually purchased these works outright in 1846.

In due course, Fothergill's industrial interests were inherited by his nephew, Richard Fothergill.

References

Sources

Journals

Online

Rowland
1794 births
1871 deaths
British ironmasters
19th-century British businesspeople